The El Dorado grass mouse or Utcubamba akodont (Akodon orophilus) is a species of rodent in the family Cricetidae.
It is found in Ecuador and Peru.

References

Akodon
Mammals of Peru
Mammals described in 1913
Taxonomy articles created by Polbot